Derby Highway is a highway linking Great Northern Highway in Western Australia with the town of Derby.  It is a  2-lane single carriageway.  In the town of Derby, its name changes to Loch Street, where it becomes a 2-lane divided carriageway.

The RAAF Curtin inactive air force base is situated adjacent to Derby Highway near the intersection of Great Northern Highway.  The base has been previously used as a refugee detention centre and civilian airport, but is not presently used for any functional purpose.

Tourism
Derby Highway is the western terminus of the popular Gibb River Road.  It is also a useful access for many local fishing "secret spots" at the mouth of the Fitzroy River, with one of the better known ones being the Cuttings.

Reconstruction
A staged reconstruction of the highway has been taking place in recent years.

See also

 Highways in Australia
 List of highways in Western Australia

References

Highways in rural Western Australia